Never on Sunday is a Greek movie released in 1960.

Never on Sunday can also refer to:

"Never on Sunday" (song), a popular song introduced in the movie by the same name and recorded by many groups thereafter
Never on Sunday (album), a 1961 jazz album by the Ramsey Lewis Trio
"Never on Sunday", a 1993 episode in the television series Step by Step
"Never on Sunday, a working title of the Frank Zappa song "Take Your Clothes Off When You Dance"